Arazi ( Ărāzī,  Arāzī) is a Hebrew and Arabic surname. Notable people with the surname include:

Efi Arazi (1937–2013), Israeli businessman
Hicham Arazi (born 1973), Moroccan male tennis player
Reuven Arazi, Israeli politician
Yardena Arazi (born 1951), Israeli singer and entertainer
Yehudah Arazi (1907–1959), Polish Jew active in the Haganah paramilitary in Palestine and the Israel Defense Forces

See also 
 Arazi (disambiguation)

Arabic-language surnames
Hebrew-language surnames

cs:Arazi
fr:Arazi (homonymie)
he:ארזי
pl:Arazi